Liaoyuan is a prefecture-level city in Jilin province, People's Republic of China. It is bounded on the west and south by Tieling of Liaoning province, west and north by Siping, and east by Tonghua and Jilin City. Liaoyuan has a total population of 1,176,645 in the prefecture, while the urban area has a population of 462,233.

History
Liaoyuan was an imperial hunting ground during the Qing dynasty, going by the name Shengjing Paddock. Ordinary citizens were prohibited from entering this region until late 1800s, when waves of immigrants from Hebei, Shandong and Henan began to populate Manchuria (see Chuang Guandong). In 1902, Qing government established Xi'an County in this region, which became today's Xi'an District.

The discovery of coal underground shortly afterwards brought prosperity to the city. Between 1931 and 1945, Xi'an was an important coal-mining city in Manchukuo and also the place where American Army General Jonathan M. Wainwright was held as a prisoner. After World War II, Xi'an County was renamed to Beifeng County to avoid confusion with Xi'an in Shaanxi. During the Chinese Civil War, Xi'an was a focal point of the intense fighting between the Communist and Nationalist forces until the summer of 1947 when it was permanently captured by the Communist force. The city was renamed Liaoyuan (literally the source of the East Liao River) in 1952, and the county previously named Liaoyuan was renamed to Shuangliao. As a county-level city, Liaoyuan was under Siping Prefecture's jurisdiction till 1983, when it became a prefecture-level city, administering two districts and two counties.

Geography and Climate
Liaoyuan has a temperate semi-humid monsoon climate. The average annual sunshine totals 2,580 hours, while the average annual precipitation is just above . Liaoyuan is replete with water resources. There are 56 rivers and streams running through the city, including tributes of Liao River and Songhua River. In addition, Liaoyuan is also rich in timber and mineral resources. Mineral resources such as limestone, marble, coal, silica, and wollastonite are abundant. Forests cover 42% of the city's lands.

Administrative divisions

Economy
Coal mining in Liaoyuan started in late Qing dynasty and continued to be the most important industry for more than 100 years. During the Japanese occupation from 1931 to 1945, Liaoyuan was the second largest coal-mining center of Manchukuo, preceded only by Fushun. This city continued to produce approximately 3 million tons of coal every year till the mid 1990s, when the exhaustion of coal resource brought the economy of this city to a standstill. The city succeeded in transforming its economic structure from a mining oriented one to a light manufacturing oriented one. At present, the city is the largest cotton-sock manufacturing center in China. Furthermore, the aluminum shell of Apple MacBook Pro is also manufactured in this city. Liaoyuan has a GDP of RMB 50 billion in 2011, rising 15.6% year on year.

Transportation
The Changchun-Liaoyuan Expressway and the Siping-Meihekou Railway run through the city. Changchun Airport is within one and a half-hour's drive from Liaoyuan.

Tourism

Guandong deer meat is one of the popular dishes among local people since Liaoyuan has a long history of raising deer.

Notable people
Xie Jun, Chinese chess grandmaster, former Women's World Chess Champion
Yan Xuejing, Chinese Errenzhuan and TV-series actress
Xue Cun, Chinese singer, movie director

Accident
On December 16, 2005, a fire in Liaoyuan Central Hospital killed at least 39 people, 33 of whom were patients. The cause of the fire was wire-aging, as reported by local media.(BBC)

Sports

The 15,000-capacity Liaoyuan Stadium is the largest stadium in the city. It opened in 2006 and it is used mostly for association football matches. The stadium also has an athletics track.

Sister cities

 Cherepovets, Vologda Oblast, Russia

References

External links
Liaoyuan Public Information Network(Chinese)
Official Website of Liaoyuan Government(Chinese)
Liaoyuan Online(Chinese)

 
Cities in Jilin
Prefecture-level divisions of Jilin